Leona Dare (1854/55 – May 23/24, 1922) was an American trapeze artist and aerial acrobat, billed often as the "Queen of the Antilles" or the "Pride of Madrid". She was famous for her stunts on trapezes suspended from ascending balloons.

Leona Dare's real name was Susan Adeline Stuart or Stewart. Her teachers in acrobatics were the Hall brothers, Thomas and Stewart Hall, who were sometimes billed as the "Brothers Dare". In 1871, she married Thomas Hall in New Orleans or in New York City (sources disagree). The same year, she debuted as an artist at Nixon's Amphitheatre in New York City; a year later, she was with the circus of Joel E. Warner. Her specialty was the "iron jaw" act, in which she held onto her supporting apparatus with nothing but the strength of her bite, or in which she herself held other artists or their supports with her mouth only. In August 1872, she performed in Indianapolis for the first time suspended under a hot-air balloon, lifting her husband and partner off the ground, holding him by his waistband only with her teeth.

Subsequently, she toured through Europe. Her performances at the foremost locations in Europe, including the Folies Bergère in Paris, made her rather famous in Europe. In 1875, she left her husband, though she later claimed he had abandoned her. An accident in the late 1870s forced her to put her career on hold for several years. In June 1880, while still recovering, she married Ernest Theodore Grunebaum in London, a well-off son of a family from Vienna. Back in Chicago later that year, it was discovered that she was still married to Hall, yet she managed to get a divorce from Hall (in absentia) on November 15 and remarried Grunebaum in Chicago on November 17, 1880.

Later in the early 1880s, she appeared again on European stages. In 1884, she had accident during a performance in Valencia in Spain, where she let drop her partner, who died of his injuries.

In 1888, Leona Dare teamed up with Swiss balloonist Eduard Spelterini. He would take her, suspended under the basket of his balloon, to great heights (some sources speak of 5,000 feet), while she performed her acrobatics. Their ascents in June and July 1888 at the Crystal Palace in London made them world-famous, and together they toured through Europe until Moscow. In October 1889, they were at Bucharest, apparently their last performance together.

In 1890, Leona Dare was again in Paris. During another balloon show, she let go of the trapeze when the balloon drifted away, and broke her leg. Around 1894/95, she appears to have stopped performing altogether. After her retirement, she lived at Oakwood, Staten Island. She died at Spokane, Washington at the age of 67.

References

Sources 

Leona Dare's Trapeze, New York Times, June 9, 1879; from the London News, May 29, 1879.
 The Romance in a Trapeze Performer's Life, New York Times, November 26, 1880; from the Chicago Tribune, November 17, 1880.
An Acrobat's Nervousness, New York Times, November 23, 1884.
Leona Dare, Acrobat, Dead, New York Times, May 25, 1922.
Leona Dare's accident at the Princess's Theatre, Valencia, Spain, The Entr'acte, London, December 13, 1884.
Buiu, I. V.: Contributions to the history of aeronautics in Romania, English abstract, Ph.D. thesis, 2007.
Capus, A.: "Geschenke des Himmels", p. 36-50 in Das Magazin 38/2007. In German.
Crouch, T. D.: The Eagle Aloft: Two Centuries of the Balloon in America, Smithsonian Institution Press, 1983. .

Slout, W. L.: Olympians of the Sawdust Circle: A Biographical Dictionary of the Nineteenth Century American Circus, Clipper Studies in the Theatre, No. 18; Borgo Press, 1997. .
Tait, P.: Circus Bodies: Cultural Identity in Aerial Performance, p. 45-48 and p. 159, notes 23 and 24. Routledge Chapman & Hall, 2005. .

1922 deaths
1850s births
Acrobats
American circus performers
Trapeze artists